Dianzhongia  is an extinct genus of tritylodontid mammaliamorphs from the Sinemurian (Early Jurassic) of Yunnan, China. Only partial cranial remains from the Zhangjiawa locality of the Lufeng Formation can so far be attributed to this animal. It may be synonymous with the related genus Lufengia.

References

Tritylodontids
Prehistoric cynodont genera
Sinemurian genera
Early Jurassic synapsids
Jurassic synapsids of Asia
Jurassic China
Fossils of China
Fossil taxa described in 1981